Clarke Kelly (born 1987) is a Canadian politician. He is currently the city councillor for West Carleton-March Ward on Ottawa City Council. He was first elected in the 2022 Ottawa municipal election.

Early life
Kelly grew up in Crown Point in West Carleton Township, living one door down from his current residence. He played youth ice hockey for the West Carleton Warriors and soccer for the West Carleton Talons. He attended elementary school at St. Michaels in Fitzroy Harbour and high school at West Carleton Secondary School. Kelly received a bachelor's degree in political science from Carleton University and a diploma in Communication and Media Studies from Algonquin College. Until June 2022,  he worked on Parliament Hill for four years for two Liberal Members of Parliament, Karen McCrimmon and Ryan Turnbull.

Career
West Carleton-March Ward's councillor Eli El-Chantiry announced he was not running for re-election in the 2022 Ottawa municipal election, leaving the seat open. During the election campaign, fixing roads was one of Kelly's top priorities. His other priorities included safe roads, supporting farms, sustainable development that is less destructive to natural habitats and more recreation facilities. In the election, Kelly narrowly won the seat, defeating Sasha Duguay, a legislative assistant to a Conservative MP by just over 200 votes, with 27% of the vote. 

Following his election, Kelly was named Vice-Chair of the Agriculture and Rural Affairs Committee, and was named to the Built Heritage Committee, the Emergency Preparedness and Protective Services Committee, the Planning and Housing Committee, and the Committee of Revision. He was also named to the Ottawa Community Lands Development Corporation and Mississippi River Valley Conservation Authority.

Kelly's constituency assistant Lisa McGee is also the mayor of next-door Arnprior.

References

Living people
Ottawa city councillors
Algonquin College alumni
Carleton University alumni 
1987 births